Gehyra lacerata, also known as the lacerated dtella or the Kanchanaburi four-clawed gecko, is a species of gecko. It is native to Thailand and Vietnam.

References

Gehyra
Geckos of Thailand
Geckos of Vietnam
Reptiles described in 1962
Taxa named by Edward Harrison Taylor